Brazil at War is a 1943 propaganda short documentary film produced by the Office of War Information and the Office of the Coordinator of Inter-American Affairs.

The 9-minute-long film starts by showing Brazil's comparisons with the United States, such as its geographic size, population, and military history during World War I. It trumpets Brazil's supposed "progressiveness" under Getúlio Vargas, noting that Rio de Janeiro is a "modern city" known for its arts and culture, and that Brazil's constitution allows freedom for its workers and social services. Then shots of the Brazilian Army and Navy are shown, and we are told that 3 million conscripts are planned. (A Brazilian Expeditionary Force did later see action in the Italian Campaign.)

After the segment on Brazil's military, the economic contributions of Brazil are delved into, especially its rubber and crystal production.

External links
 

1943 films
American World War II propaganda shorts
Films set in Rio de Janeiro (city)
Brazil in World War II
Articles containing video clips
American black-and-white films
American short documentary films
1943 documentary films
1940s short documentary films
1940s English-language films
1940s American films